The 1971–72 Yugoslav First Basketball League season was the 28th season of the Yugoslav First Basketball League,  the top-tier professional basketball league in SFR Yugoslavia.

Notable events

Early pacesetters: Zvezda, Jugoplastika, and Lokomotiva 
The season began in early November 1971 with Crvena zvezda, defending champion Jugoplastika, Lokomotiva, and Olimpija tipped as main title contenders by the observers.

Olimpija fell out of the title contention almost immediately, recording several losses in their first few games of the season while Crvena zvezda and Lokomotiva jumped to the top of the standings early on. Jugoplastika also kept pace with the standings leaders while Borac Čačak, finding success behind Radmilo Mišović's scoring exploits, and Radnički Belgrade became the early season's surprise packages.

In week 4 of the season, Crvena zvezda and Jugoplastika played a hard-fought game in Belgrade's Hala sportova with Zvezda coming out on top 98–86. In addition to highly competitive basketball and Zoran Slavnić's exceptional performance, the game is also remembered for the bench-clearing brawl that occurred with four minutes to go in the contest after Jugoplastika's point guard Rato Tvrdić punched Zvezda's shooting guard Duci Simonović.

Zadar vs Zvezda on Catholic Christmas 1971 
On Saturday, 25 December 1971, as part of the season's week 8, KK Zadar and Crvena zvezda faced off at KK Zadar's Jazine home court—a tense and incident-filled contest remembered for the extremely hostile atmosphere with nationalist and sectarian overtones directed towards the visiting team by the home fans. Scheduled to be played on Catholic Christmas—a holiday not officially celebrated in communist SFR Yugoslavia—the game featured tensions even before tip off as the visiting Crvena zvezda players and personnel had to be escorted by police from the moment of their arrival in Zadar.

As the teams entered the Jazine court before the game, the hosts decided to power off the arena lights while the only light in the hall was provided from the thousands of candles distributed out to the gathered spectators. Following the tip off, Zadar fans began throwing the said candles onto the court, continuing to do so throughout the game while the referees — brothers Janko and Petar Kavčić from Ljubljana — didn't stop the contest out of fear of enraging the crowd even more. Among the verbal abuse hurled at Zvezda players were hate speech chants "Srbe na vrbe". With five minutes to go in the close game, Zadar's best player and leading scorer Josip Gjergja twisted his ankle after stepping on one of the candles littering the court and had to leave the contest. Zvezda ended up winning 60–61.

As soon as the game ended, Zvezda players were surrounded by police mid-court as the angry Zadar fans tried to physically accost the visiting team. Shortly, even the army had to be called in as re-enforcement in order to escort the visiting team out of the arena. In the chaos and confusion while the Zvezda players were surrounded by army recruits out on the court, a young female Zadar fan got in-between two of the soldiers guarding Zvezda players and stabbed Zvezda's shooting guard Ivan Sarjanović in the upper thigh with a compass.

League table

Single-game title playoff 
Due to Crvena Zvezda and Jugoplastika being tied for the top spot with identical 17–5 records at the end of the season, the champion was decided in a one-game playoff between the two teams since, as stipulated by the Basketball Federation of Yugoslavia regulations, points difference wasn't legitimate criteria to determine a league champion in case of a tie at the top. The regulations further stated that the deciding game's venue had to be neutral and mutually agreed upon between the two teams. Crvena Zvezda requested Sarajevo while Jugoplastika wanted Ljubljana. Due to the teams' inability to agree, the venue was decided by coin toss that was won by Jugoplastika.

Accordingly, the game ended up being played in Ljubljana's Tivoli Hall on Thursday, 27 April 1972. In a close game (Jugoplastika was up by four 35–39 at halftime), Zvezda's playmaker Zoran Slavnić hit a shot within final thirty seconds for a 67–67 tie at the end of regulation. Zvezda ended up winning 75–70 largely behind Zoran Lazarević's 12 points, all of which he scored towards the end of regulation and in overtime.

Winning Roster 
The winning roster of Crvena Zvezda:
 Goran Rakočević, Zoran Lazarević, Ivan Sarjanović, Božidar Pešić, Vladimir Cvetković, Života Bogosavljević, Dragan Kapičić, Ljubodrag Simonović, Dragiša Vučinić, Zoran Latifić, Tihomir Pavlović,  Zoran Slavnić, Risto Kubura, Ljupče Žugić, Bogosav Stefanović
 Head coach: Bratislav Đorđević

Qualification in 1972-73 season European competitions 
FIBA European Champions Cup
 Crvena Zvezda (champions)

FIBA Cup Winner's Cup
 Jugoplastika (Cup winners)

FIBA Korać Cup
 Lokomotiva (3rd)
 Rabotnički (5th)

References 

Yugoslav First Basketball League seasons
Yugo
Yugo